McDonald Brothers may refer to:

Richard and Maurice McDonald who developed McDonald's fast food system and sold golden arches to Ray Kroc
McDonald Brothers (architects), in Louisville, Kentucky, U.S.A.
McDonald Brothers (gangsters) (died 1940), English mobsters
McDonald Brothers and Co., former name of Macdonald Tobacco, a firm in Montreal, Quebec, Canada
McDonald brothers (priests), Irish priests active in the early Catholic Church in New Zealand
 McDonald Brothers, Canadian aircraft manufacturing company that became Bristol Aerospace

See also
 MacDonald Brothers (active from 1981), a Scottish family of pipers and folk musicians
 The MacDonald Brothers (active from 2006), a Scottish pop folk duo who competed in The X Factor